Jesús Alexander Aguilar (born June 30, 1990) is a Venezuelan professional baseball first baseman for the Oakland Athletics of Major League Baseball (MLB). He has previously played in MLB for the Cleveland Indians, Milwaukee Brewers, Tampa Bay Rays, Miami Marlins and Baltimore Orioles. Aguilar was an All-Star in 2018.

Career

Cleveland Indians
Aguilar signed with the Cleveland Indians as an amateur free agent in November 2007. He spent his first two seasons with the Dominican Summer League Indians. After splitting 2010 between two minor league teams, he hit 23 home runs during the 2011 season between the Lake County Captains of the Class A Midwest League and the Kinston Indians of the Class A-Advanced Carolina League. In 2011, Aguilar was also on the Carolina Mudcats roster, then an affiliate of the Cleveland Indians. Aguilar and Francisco Lindor represented the Indians in the 2012 All-Star Futures Game.  The Indians invited Aguilar to spring training in 2013 as a non-roster invitee.

Playing for the Akron Aeros of the Class AA Eastern League in 2013, Aguilar had a .275 batting average, 28 doubles, 16 home runs, and 105 runs batted in (RBIs), setting an Akron franchise record in RBIs. He was added to the Indians 40-man roster on November 20, 2013.

Starting the 2014 season with the Columbus Clippers of the Class AAA International League, Aguilar batted .298 with seven home runs and 19 RBIs in 37 games, before the Indians promoted him to the major leagues on May 15, 2014. He was returned to Columbus on June 6 after playing in eight games for the Indians.

Aguliar began the 2015 season with Columbus. He was named the International League's starting first baseman in the Triple-A All-Star Game. The Indians promoted Aguilar back to the major leagues on July 24. In 2016, Aguilar led the International League with 30 home runs and 92 RBIs. However, the Indians designated Aguilar for assignment on January 26, 2017.

Milwaukee Brewers
Aguilar was claimed off waivers by the Milwaukee Brewers on February 2, 2017. After a strong performance during spring training in 2017, Aguilar made the Brewers' Opening Day roster. He played in 133 games, finishing the season with a .265 batting average, .331 OBP, 16 home runs, and 52 RBIs. 

Aguilar continued to play in 2018, due to an injury to Eric Thames. Batting .307 with 23 home runs and 67 RBIs, he won the NL's Final Vote for the 2018 MLB All-Star Game and he also accepted an invitation to participate in the Home Run Derby. He cooled off in the second half, but still finished the season hitting .274 with 35 home runs and 108 RBI, and tied for the major league lead in sacrifice flies (10). In the 2018 NLDS, against the Colorado Rockies, he went 1-for-11 with a home run in Game 3 off of German Marquez in the Brewers' series-clinching 6-0 victory. In October 2018, Aguilar was awarded the Luis Aparicio Award, which is given annually to a Venezuelan player in Major League Baseball who is judged to have recorded the best individual performance in that year.

Tampa Bay Rays

On July 31, 2019, the Brewers traded Aguilar to the Tampa Bay Rays in exchange for Jake Faria. After the trade to Tampa Bay, Aguilar hit .261 in 37 games for the team. He was designated for assignment on November 27, 2019.

Miami Marlins
On December 2, 2019, the Miami Marlins claimed Aguilar off of waivers. In 2020, Aguilar hit .277/.352/.457 with eight home runs and 34 RBIs during the shortened 60-game season. In 2021, Aguilar hit .261/.329/.459 with 22 home runs and 93 RBIs in 131 games.

After batting .236 with 15 home runs and 49 RBIs in 2022, Aguilar was designated for assignment by the Marlins on August 26. He cleared waivers and was released on August 28.

Baltimore Orioles
Aguilar signed a minor league contract with the Baltimore Orioles on August 31, 2022. He had his contract selected on September 1, 2022. He batted .235/.281/.379 between the two teams, and had the slowest running speed from home plate to first base, at 5.01 seconds.

Oakland Athletics
On January 27, 2023, Aguilar signed a one-year, $3 million contract with the Oakland Athletics.

Personal life
Aguilar was born to Jesus and Maria Aguilar, and is the youngest of three children.

See also
 List of Major League Baseball players from Venezuela

References

External links

1990 births
Living people
Akron Aeros players
Arizona League Indians players
Baltimore Orioles players
Carolina Mudcats players
Cleveland Indians players
Columbus Clippers players
Dominican Summer League Indians players
Venezuelan expatriate baseball players in the Dominican Republic
Kinston Indians players
Lake County Captains players
Leones del Caracas players
Luis Aparicio Award winners
Mahoning Valley Scrappers players
Major League Baseball first basemen
Major League Baseball players from Venezuela
Miami Marlins players
Milwaukee Brewers players
National League All-Stars
Phoenix Desert Dogs players
Sportspeople from Maracay
Tampa Bay Rays players
Venezuelan expatriate baseball players in the United States